Vasileostrovsky District is a district of the federal city of St. Petersburg, Russia. As of the 2010 Census, its population was 214,625; down from 236,856 recorded in the 2002 Census.

Geography
The district occupies the territories of Vasilyevsky and Dekabristov Islands and includes a smaller Serny Island.

History
The district was one of the first established in Petrograd in 1917.

Municipal divisions
Vasileostrovsky District comprises the following five municipal okrugs:
#7
Ostrov Dekabristov
Gavan
Morskoy
Vasilyevsky

Transportation 
Vasilievsky island is connected to the mainland by 6 bridges, 2 bridge of the Western Rapid Diameter and 4 other bridges built before.
Also on Vasilevsky island there are 3 underground stations, which are on the green line they are the Primorskaya and Vasileostrovskaya, and the purple line station Sportivnaya. Three more stations were also built on the orange line.

References

Notes

Sources